The Hot Rats Sessions is a 6-CD box set celebrating the 50th anniversary of the Frank Zappa album Hot Rats. It was released on December 20, 2019.

Content 
The first four discs contain recordings from during the making of the album. Disc five contains the 1987 digital remix of the album. This was the version available on CDs before the 2012 re-release. The album also contains extended versions of many tracks from this period, such as "The Gumbo Variations" (here titled "Big Legs"), a section of "Little House I Used To Live In" (here titled "Another Waltz"), and "Toads of the Short Forest" (here titled "Arabesque"). The rest of disc five and disc six consist of extras such as outtakes, radio ads, and track mixes. It also features an excerpt of an interview explaining the origin of the album title and further excerpts from an interview of Zappa explaining the character of Willie the Pimp: a part of this interview was featured on the posthumous album Mystery Disc.

Reception 

Writing for Rolling Stone, Kory Grow enjoyed the album but thought that it was flawed, stating that while it was a very interesting listen for those curious about the making of the album, it could feel like overkill at certain times.

Track listing

References 

2019 compilation albums
Frank Zappa compilation albums